A roommate is a person who shares living quarters.

Roommate or Roommates may also refer to:

Film and TV
 "I, Roommate", a 1999 episode of TV show Futurama
The Roommate, a 2011 film
Roommate (TV series), a 2014 South Korean reality TV show
Roommates (1995 film), a 1995 American comedy-drama film
Roommates (TV series), a 2009 American sitcom
Roommates (2006 Korean film), a 2006 South Korean film
Roommates (2006 Telugu film), a 2006 Indian film
Roommates (1961 film), also known as Raising the Wind, a 1961 British comedy film
Roommate (2013 film), a 2013 Japanese film

Other uses
Roommate (band), a Chicago band
Roommates (video game), a 2014 visual novel video game by Winter Wolves
Roommates (web series) 
RoomMate, a device, designed in the UK, that provides an audio description of a public space to a Visually Impaired user